is a Japanese voice actress and singer from Gifu Prefecture.

Career
Kohara's interest in voice acting began in high school; growing up, she was a fan of manga and anime like Naruto. She later moved to Tokyo to pursue a music career, and graduated from ESP College of Entertainment, a vocational school that specializes in electric guitar and basses. According to a high school friend, Kohara switched from vocals to guitar when her guitarist band mate asked to switch their position. While she was in vocational school, she studied under BURNY's guitarist Masanori Kusakabe, who is also from Gifu Prefecture. Therefore, Kohara inherited Kusakabe's playing style.

In July 2011, Kohara became a member of The Sketchbook, a band based on a fictional group in the anime Sket Dance. She learned of the band hosting auditions while attending ESP College of Entertainment; although she had not played guitar in three months and was considering quitting, she passed her audition and won the guitarist position. Joined by Hiroshi Tada (vocal and bass) and Yuu Watanabe (drum), the three performed the opening, endings, and insert songs for the anime. The band disbanded in 2015 as the members wanted to focus on their own dreams. 

In 2014, one year prior to The Sketchbook's disbandment, Kohara debuted as a voice actress with her first role as a vegetable-hater boy in Soreyuke! Anpanman. 

In 2018, Kohara was recruited by Bushiroad president Takaaki Kidani to join the music franchise BanG Dream! after a fan sent a video of her performances to Kidani on social media. She joined the franchise's backup band The Third (Beta) as guitarist during its first live on March 25, 2018 at Shimokitazawa Garden. The band was renamed to Raise A Suilen at the second live on July 17, and its members received their own in-universe anime and game characters at the BanG Dream! 6th☆Live on December 7. Kohara's character Rokka Asahi shares various traits with her voice actress, such as moving from Gifu to Tokyo, while her birthday is July 17. Kohara used to perform with a Gibson Les Paul, but switched to Strandberg after joining RAS.

Personal life
Kohara has an older sister.

Filmography

Television anime series
 BanG Dream! as Rokka Asahi/Lock
 BanG Dream! 2nd Season (2019)
 BanG Dream! 3rd Season (2020)
 BanG Dream! Girls Band Party! Pico: Ohmori (2020)
 BanG Dream! Episode of Roselia II: Song I am. (2021)
 BanG Dream! Film Live 2nd Stage (2021)
 BanG Dream! Girls Band Party! Pico Fever! (2021)
 BanG Dream! Poppin'Dream! (2022)
 Caligula as Lily
 Phantasy Star Online 2 The Animation as Riko
 Idol Memories as Nanami Hoshi
 Sket Dance as Female Kid's Singer 
 Soreyuke! Anpanman as Nekomi, Vegetable-hater boy
 Ice Kuritaro as Berry-chan
 25-sai no Joshikōsei as Hasegawa
 Persona 5: The Animation as female character
 Senran Kagura Shinovi Master as Gekkō
 Gifu no Tate ka Yoko as Tatekayoko
 Kandagawa Jet Girls as Misa Aoi
 The 8th Son? Are You Kidding Me? as Miliyama
 Teppen!!!!!!!!!!!!!!! Laughing 'til You Cry as Mako Shirakabe

Video games 
 Art Code Summoner as Gustave Courbet
 Azur Lane as USS Richmond (CL-9)
 BanG Dream! Girls Band Party! as Rokka Asahi/Lock
 Hoshizora Tetsudō to Shiro no Tabi as Hanae
 Kandagawa Jet Girls as Misa Aoi
 Shinobi Master Senran Kagura: New Link as Gekkō
 Wonder Gravity as Pycno
 Crash Fever as Noa
 Arknights as Mulberry
Counter:Side as Lin Xien

References

External links

Living people
Voice actresses from Gifu Prefecture
Musicians from Gifu Prefecture
Japanese video game actresses
Japanese voice actresses
1990 births
Anime singers
21st-century Japanese actresses
21st-century Japanese women musicians